"Never Say Never" is the second single by Australian band Vandalism. It was their first release with Capitol Records and is from their debut album, Turn the World On. The song peaked at number 15 in Australia and number eight in Finland.

Track listing
Australian CD single
 "Never Say Never" (original radio edit) – 2:56
 "Never Say Never" (Dirty South mix) – 7:16
 "It's All Your Fault" (radio edit) – 2:46
 "Never Say Never" (Mr. Timothy mix) – 6:34
 "Never Say Never" (original extended mix) – 5:57
 "Never Say Never" (Punq DJ's 'Be Discreet' mix) – 8:26

Charts

Weekly charts

Year-end charts

Release history

References

Vandalism (band) songs
2006 singles
2006 songs
Capitol Records singles
Songs written by Debora Iyall